Tasmina is a given name. Notable people with the name include:

Tasmina Ahmed-Sheikh (born 1970), Scottish politician
Tasmina Perry, British novelist

Feminine given names